Stine Larsen (born 24 January 1996) is a Danish professional footballer who plays as a forward for BK Häcken in the Swedish Damallsvenskan and for the Danish national team. She has earlier played for Brøndby IF of Denmark's Elitedivisionen and FC Fleury 91 in the Division 1 Féminine.

Club career
After joining Brøndby IF as a 12-year-old, Larsen progressed into the first team in 2013 and quickly became an important player. Team coach Per Nielsen praised her as a potential female Kim Vilfort.

On 30 July 2020, Larsen signed for newly-promoted Aston Villa in the Women's Super League.

International career

Larsen made her senior international debut for Denmark in January 2015, starting a 1–1 friendly draw with New Zealand in Belek, Turkey. Although she began her national team career as a defender, versatile Larsen was named as a forward for a UEFA European Championship 2017 qualifying Group 4 win over Slovakia in June 2016. Due to tournament-ending injuries to teammates Janni Arnth and Mie Leth Jans, Larsen was reverted to playing as a defender for the national team at the UEFA European Championship 2017 and has been a starter in the defence since.

International goals
Scores and results list Denmark's goal tally first.

Honours

Club
Brøndby IF
 Elitedivisionen
 Winner: 2014–15, 2016–17
 Runners-up:
 Landspokalturneringen
 Winner: 2014, 2015, 2017

Country
UEFA Women's Euro 2017: Runners-up

Individual
 2015: Danish Breakthrough Player of the Year
 2018: Elitedivisionen Player of the Year

References

External links
Profile at Danish Football Association 

1996 births
Living people
Danish women's footballers
Women's association football defenders
Women's association football forwards
Brøndby IF (women) players
Denmark women's international footballers
Danish expatriate women's footballers
Danish expatriate sportspeople in England
Expatriate women's footballers in England
Aston Villa W.F.C. players
BK Häcken FF players
People from Glostrup Municipality
Sportspeople from the Capital Region of Denmark
UEFA Women's Euro 2022 players
UEFA Women's Euro 2017 players
Association football defenders
Association football forwards
Denmark international footballers